The Battle of Torisaka (鳥坂峠の戦い) took place during the Sengoku period (16th century) of Japan. 
Kōno Michinao asked for the assistance of the Mōri clan in his struggle against Utsunomiya Toyotsuna. The Mōri agreed to the alliance, and sent Kobayakawa Takakage.  

Kōno and Kobayakawa brought their combined forces against Utsunomiya Toyotsuna at the Battle of Torisaka and were victorious. However, the Kōno region was retained by Toyotsuna after his defeat in this battle.

References

The Samurai Sourcebook

1568 in Japan
Torisaka
Torisaka